Alajõe may refer to several places in Estonia:

Alajõe Parish, municipality in Ida-Viru County
Alajõe, Ida-Viru County, village in Alutaguse Parish, Ida-Viru County
Alajõe, Tartu County, village in Peipsiääre Parish, Tartu County